Gajendra Singh Khimsar (born 25 December 1959) is king of Khimsarand and MLA from Lohawat, Rajasthan. He was appointed as a minister of industry. He is also a hotelier and a sport enthusiast.

Early life 
GSK was born in 1959 in Khimsar Fort. He completed his schooling from The Doon School and went on to pursue Bachelor of Business Administration from The University of Western Ontario, Canada.

Political career
He is a Member of Legislative Assembly from Lohawat, Rajasthan since 2003. He held responsibilities as Minister of Energy, Govt. of Rajasthan (2003-2008). He was also Minister of Forests, Environment and Sports and Youth Affairs in Second Vasundhara Raje ministry.

Personal life

Family
GSK married Priti Kumari on 25 February 1982. They have a son and a daughter.

Sports and business 
He also represented India at the World Squash Championship. During his college years, he was ranked 28th in the PSA (Professional Squash Association) world rankings. He was also ranked no.2 in Canada and was the finalist of the US and Canadian Open. A Hotelier by profession, the Khimsar Group of Hotels has been recipient of the 'National Grand Heritage Award For Excellence'- the highest recognition conferred upon any heritage property by the Department of Tourism, Government of India.

References

Members of the Rajasthan Legislative Assembly
Bharatiya Janata Party politicians from Rajasthan
The Doon School alumni
University of Western Ontario alumni
Indian hoteliers
People from Jodhpur district
Living people
1957 births
State cabinet ministers of Rajasthan